Breathe (TC: 呼吸) is a Cantopop album by Edmond Leung.

Track listing
Breathe (呼吸)
Can or Can't (可不可不可以)
Dear (親愛的)
Lovelorn Ten Thousand Times (失戀一萬次)
Punish Me (懲罰我)
Three Broken Hearts (傷了三個心)
Love and Affection (愛與情)
All I Need Is Love (我需要的只是愛)
I Want To Fly (我要先飛)
I Am Wrong (我錯)
Fight For Tomorrow (為明日爭氣)
Color, Aroma and Taste (濃情色香味)

Charts

Music awards

References

Edmond Leung albums
1996 albums